Kevin Lamont Richardson (born May 15, 1986) is an American former starting running back for the Appalachian State Mountaineers for the 2005–2007 seasons. He holds school records for the most career rushing yards (4,804), the most rushing yards in a single season (1,676 in 2006), the highest career all-purpose yardage (6,104), and the most rushing touchdowns in a single season (30 in 2006). Richardson was a key contributor to three seasons of unprecedented success for the Mountaineers. He scored multiple touchdowns in all three of the team's FCS championship victories, and he rushed for 88 yards in the Mountaineers' 34–32 upset victory over the then #5 Michigan Wolverines of the Football Bowl Subdivision.

External links
Appalachian State website: Kevin Richardson biography
ESPN website: Kevin Richardson profile, with career statistics
Winston-Salem Journal: a 2006 profile of the former walkon
2006 Southern Conference Offensive Player of the Year

1986 births
Living people
People from Elizabethtown, North Carolina
Players of American football from North Carolina
American football running backs
Appalachian State Mountaineers football players